The Women's 500 metres event was held on February 1. 10 athletes participated.

Schedule
All times are Almaty Time (UTC+06:00)

Records

500 meters

500 meters × 2

Results

References

Women 500